Trident is the name of several supervillains appearing in American comic books published by DC Comics.

Publication history
The Trident Trio first appeared in New Teen Titans #33 and were created by Marv Wolfman and George Pérez. Marv Wolfman later acknowledged that he recycled the idea of different people posing as a single villain from his earlier characters the Brothers Grimm.

Fictional character biography

Trident Trio
In the story, the three alter-egos of Trident were operatives of the H.I.V.E. who later splintered from the group. "Prof" was a weapons design specialist. Sammy Jaye was an enforcer. The third one was an unidentified black man that used to fight in the Golden Gloves. Eventually, they decide to team up and strike out on their own. Each adopts the costume and code-name of Trident, and each is armed with a powerful trident. The trident's right tine shoots fire, the left tine shoots ice, and the center tine releases a blast of devastating force. Trident operates in New York City, each criminal taking turns at committing several large robberies, leading the public to believe them to be a single person. Eventually, the Sammy Jaye Trident tries to cheat his two partners out of their share of loot. The other two kill Sammy and his costumed body is discovered by the Teen Titans and the police. Starfire eventually figures out that there is more than one Trident. After tracking down the other two Tridents, the Teen Titans defeated the Tridents and they were handed over to the police.

Some time after the two surviving Tridents are imprisoned, Wildebeest springs the unnamed Trident, Gizmo, Puppeteer, and Disruptor from jail. These villains are eventually recaptured by the Teen Titans.

During the "Infinite Crisis" storyline, someone that might be the unnamed Trident was seen on the Injustice Gang's satellite as a member of Alexander Luthor Jr.'s Secret Society of Super Villains.

Karate Kid
The name Trident was also used by a Starro-infected Karate Kid who claimed to be a member of the Trident Guild. However, these beliefs were due to the effects of brainwashing by Starro.

Powers and abilities
Trident carries a trident that has three tines: the right shoots fire, the left shoots ice, and the middle releases a blast of devastating force. He can project holograms which make him appear several feet away from where he is actually standing while concealing his true position.

In other media
Trident appears in Teen Titans, voiced by Clancy Brown. This version is an arrogant fish-man and an enemy of the Atlanteans. Introduced in the episode "Deep Six", he intends to overthrow Atlantis and take over the surface world by making an army of clones of himself using toxic chemicals. However, he runs afoul of the Teen Titans and Aqualad, who trick him and his clones into arguing over who the original Trident is before trapping them in an undersea cave. In season five, Trident joins the Brotherhood of Evil to kill young heroes around the world, only to be defeated and flash-frozen alongside them by the Titans.

References

Characters created by Marv Wolfman
Characters created by George Pérez
Comics characters introduced in 1983
DC Comics supervillains
DC Comics martial artists
Fictional African-American people